Jupiter is the northernmost town in Palm Beach County, Florida, United States. According to the 2020 Census, the town had a population of 61,047 as of April 1, 2020. It is 84 miles north of Miami and 15 miles north of West Palm Beach, Jupiter is the northernmost community in the Miami metropolitan area, home to 6,012,331 people in a 2015 Census Bureau estimate. Jupiter was named the 9th Best Southern Beach Town to live in by Stacker Newsletter for 2022, was rated as the 12th Best Beach Town in the United States by WalletHub in 2018, and as the 9th Happiest Seaside Town in the United States by Coastal Living in 2012.

History
The area where the town now sits was originally named for the Hobe Indian tribe which lived at the mouth of the Loxahatchee River and whose name is also preserved in the name of nearby Hobe Sound. A mapmaker misunderstood the Spanish spelling Jobe of the native people name Hobe and recorded it as Jove. Subsequent mapmakers further misunderstood this to be the name of the Roman god Jupiter, because the declension of the word Jupiter in Latin includes the root Jov- in all cases but the nominative case and vocative case. They, therefore, adopted the more familiar name of Jupiter. The god Jupiter (or Zeus in the Greek mythology) is the chief Roman god, and the god of light, of the sky and weather, and of the state and its welfare and laws. Jupiter's consort was Juno, inspiring a neighboring town to name itself Juno Beach.

The most notable landmark is the Jupiter Inlet Lighthouse, completed in 1860. Made of brick, it was painted red in 1910 to cover discoloration caused by humidity. Hurricane Jeanne in 2004 sandblasted the paint from the upper portion of the tower, and the tower was repainted using a potassium silicate mineral coating. The lighthouse often is used as the symbol for Jupiter.

United States flag incident 
In 1999, Jupiter resident George Andres wanted to display a United States flag in his front yard; however, the homeowners association had a bylaw that prohibits the display of a flagpole in the front lawn. Andres still displayed the flag, while the homeowners association went as far as foreclosing his home to cover legal fees after being in court at least twenty-eight times. Even after governor Jeb Bush visited his home along with members of the local and national media, the homeowners association refused to budge.

George Andres later won the case and was allowed to display his flag in his front lawn with the use of a flagpole.

On July 24, 2006, President George W. Bush signed into law the Freedom to Display the American Flag Act of 2005, allowing residents to display the flag on their residential property despite any homeowners association rules.

Geography and climate
Jupiter has a unique geographical location that sticks out into the Atlantic Ocean further than any other point on the Florida coast. Since 1550, ships have considered it an important stop when sailing to Central and South America.

Jupiter has a trade-wind Tropical rainforest climate (Köppen Af). Much of the year is warm to hot in Jupiter, and frost is extremely rare. Jupiter is also known for humid summers. As is typical in South Florida, there are two basic seasons in Jupiter, a mild and dry winter (November through April), and a hot and wet summer (May through October). Daily thundershowers are common in the hot season, though they are brief. The Town of Jupiter is home to a multitude of tropical trees, and is also known for its lush landscaping around private homes and public parks.

Demographics

As of the 2020 United States census, there were 61,047 people, 26,597 households, and 17,275 families residing in the town.

In 2020, 19.1% of the population was under the age of 18, and 23.1% of the population was 65 years of age or older. Females made up 51.7% of the population in 2020, and the average household size was 2.43.

In 2020, the median income for a household in the town was $87,163, and the per capita income for the town was $57,865. Out of the total population, 7.9% were living below the poverty line.

Education
The School District of Palm Beach County provides public education. Jupiter is also home to several private schools and religious schools.

Jupiter's population is served by two public high schools: Jupiter Community High School in Jupiter, and William T. Dwyer High School in Palm Beach Gardens.

Jupiter Christian School is a private school in the town.

Universities and colleges

Harriet L. Wilkes Honors College at Florida Atlantic University

Florida Atlantic University, John D. MacArthur Campus

Public Safety

Fire Department
Since 1984, Palm Beach County Fire Rescue provides fire protection and emergency medical services to the citizens of Jupiter. There are three fire stations assigned to the town:
 Station 16 – Engine 16, Rescue 16 and Brush 16;
 Station 18 – Engine 18 and Rescue 18;
 Station 19 – Squad 19, Rescue 19, Special Operations 19, Brush 19 and 3 command vehicles.

Station 19 is the headquarters for Battalion 1, which covers Jupiter, Juno Beach, Lake Park and unincorporated areas of Palm Beach County such as Jupiter Farms and Palm Beach Country Estates.

Police Department
The Jupiter Police Department consists of 118 sworn officers and 39 civilian support staff personnel, and is headquartered in the town's municipal campus. Its operational divisions include Road Patrol, Criminal Investigations, Traffic, K-9, Marine, Beach Patrol, Crime Scene Investigation, SWAT and Hostage Negotiation.

Economy
Companies based in Jupiter include G4S Secure Solutions, Town Sports International Holdings, Holtec International, and The Babylon Bee.

Notable people
 Robert Allenby, Australian professional golfer on PGA Tour
 Rick Ankiel, professional baseball player
 Briny Baird, professional golfer on PGA Tour
 Daniel Berger, professional golfer on PGA Tour
 Matt Bosher, professional football player
 Don Brewer, drummer, singer, original member of Grand Funk Railroad
 Tyler Cameron, Contestant on the Bachelorette
 Shelby Chesnes, Playboy Playmate of the Month, July 2012
 Philip J. Corso, U.S. Army lieutenant colonel and author of The Day After Roswell
 Ernie Els, South African professional golfer on PGA Tour
 Colleen Farrington, Playboy Playmate, model, and nightclub singer
 Rickie Fowler, professional golfer on PGA Tour
 Hermes Franca, Brazilian mixed martial artist and UFC fighter
 Drew Garrett, actor
 Brendan Grace, Irish comedian
 Rob Grill, singer, The Grass Roots
 Matt Holliday, professional baseball player
 Hugh Howey, writer
 Michael Jordan, Hall of Fame NBA basketball player, majority owner of Charlotte Hornets
 Sarah Kauss, entrepreneur, S'well water bottles
 Brooks Koepka, professional golfer
 Debi Laszewski, IFBB professional bodybuilder
 Daryl Logullo, business executive and ecommerce thought leader
 Jamie Lovemark, professional golfer on PGA Tour
 Shane Lowry, Irish professional golfer on PGA tour
 Will MacKenzie, professional golfer on PGA Tour
 Steve Marino, professional golfer on PGA Tour
 Vincent Marotta, entrepreneur, co-developer of Mr. Coffee
 Rory McIlroy, professional golfer on PGA Tour
 Miles Mikolas, professional baseball player
 Jason Newsted, former bass player of Metallica
 Cody Parkey, professional football player
 Charles Nelson Reilly, actor and teacher, lived in house given to him by Burt Reynolds, who had previously lived in it with Sally Field
 Burt Reynolds, actor
 Mike Schmidt, Hall of Fame major league baseball player
 Justin Thomas, professional golfer on PGA Tour
 Dara Torres, five-time Olympic swimmer and gold medalist
 Charles Vanik, former Democratic congressman from Ohio
 Richy Werenski, professional golfer on PGA Tour
 Brett Wetterich, professional golfer on PGA Tour
 Tiger Woods, professional golfer on the PGA Tour
 Zion Wright, professional skateboarder, U.S. Olympic Skateboard Team
 Kyle Kirkwood, racing driver in the Indycar Series
 Lucas Glover, professional golfer on the PGA Tour

Points of interest

 Jupiter Inlet Lighthouse, listed on the National Register of Historic Places since 1973.
 Jupiter is the home to the Miami Marlins and St. Louis Cardinals spring training facilities as well as one of their respective Low-A Minor League Baseball affiliates, the Jupiter Hammerheads and Palm Beach Cardinals. They share the use of the Roger Dean Stadium complex, located in Abacoa. Both minor league squads compete in the Low-A Southeast.
 William P. Gwinn Airport is located in Jupiter.
 Jupiter is home to Florida Atlantic University's MacArthur Campus. This northern campus of FAU is also the location of the Harriet L. Wilkes Honors College.
 Palm Beach International Raceway a racing facility built in 1965, and was remodeled in 2008 in an attempt to obtain a FIA Grade II Certification. The Facility currently hosts several IHRA and NHRA sportsman events as well as an ARCA Remax Series event.
 The Scripps Research Institute has opened a satellite campus adjacent to the MacArthur Campus of Florida Atlantic University in Jupiter. Approximately 360 scientists and technical staff operate in a  state of the art research facility. Scripps Florida focuses on the development of therapeutic opportunities in several disease areas.
 The Max Planck Society has a facility on the FAU campus, the Max Planck Florida Institute for Neuroscience, and is the Max Planck Society's first non-European research institute.
 Jupiter beaches, many of which are dog-friendly, draw many residents and visitors from all over the world.
The Harbourside Place is an outdoor, upscale shopping mall located just South of the Jupiter Inlet Lighthouse.
Downtown Abacoa is a downtown area present adjacent to Harriet L. Wilkes Honors College in Southwest Jupiter. It houses an amphitheater, restaurants, coffee shops, a farmer's market, and the yearly Feast of Little Italy.

Media
American Horror Story: Freak Show, the fourth season of American Horror Story, is set in Jupiter in 1952.

Gallery

See also
 North Palm Beach Heights
 Abacoa

References

External links

Jupiter official website

 
Towns in Palm Beach County, Florida
Towns in Florida
Populated coastal places in Florida on the Atlantic Ocean
Beaches of Palm Beach County, Florida
Beaches of Florida